The Golden Reel Award for Outstanding Achievement in Sound Editing – Musical for Feature Film is an annual award given by the Motion Picture Sound Editors. It honors music editors whose work has warranted merit in the field of cinema; in this case, their work in musical feature films. It was first awarded in 1999, for films released the previous year, under the title Best Sound Editing – Music – Musical Feature (Foreign & Domestic). In 2002, the award dropped "Foreign & Domestic" from its title, going by Best Sound Editing – Music – Musical Feature Film. From this point, until 2017, that title would remain, or some simple variation of it. The award has been given with its current title since 2018. The category was not presented in 2021.

Winners and nominees

1990s
Best Sound Editing – Music – Musical Feature (Foreign & Domestic)

2000s

Best Sound Editing – Music – Musical Feature Film

Best Sound Editing – Music in a Musical Feature Film

2010s

Outstanding Achievement in Sound Editing – Musical for Feature Film

2020s

References

Golden Reel Awards (Motion Picture Sound Editors)